Cabin Fever: Patient Zero is a 2014 science fiction horror film directed by Kaare Andrews and written by Jake Wade Wall; it serves as a prequel to, and the third installment overall of the titular franchise. Starring Ryan Donowho, Brando Eaton, Jillian Murray, Mitch Ryan, Lydia Hearst and Sean Astin; the plot centers around a bachelor party on an isolated island, which inadvertently releases the disease from the previous two installments.

Plot
Dr. Edwards arrives at a secluded island laboratory to examine Mr. Porter. Although Porter carries a deadly flesh-eating bacteria, he is asymptomatic and shows no signs of necrosis. Along with fellow researchers Camila and Bridgett, Dr. Edwards spends two months examining Porter in isolation. Porter continually asks to see his wife, but he is continually denied.

Marcus prepares to marry wealthy heiress Kate Arias in the Dominican Republic. Mark's best friend Dobs, his brother Josh, and Josh's girlfriend Penny charter a boat and take Mark to a supposedly unpopulated island for a low-key bachelor party. While en route to the island, Penny, Mark's former flame, attempts to seduce him but is rebuffed.

Sympathetic researcher Camila creates a rapport with Porter. Frustrated with his confinement, Porter intentionally infects one of the researchers as he begins revolting against his continued isolation. Porter warns Camila that he is dangerous. Bridgett becomes infected.

Josh and Penny go snorkeling and see the decomposing carcasses of sea animals littering the ocean floor. When they return to camp, Josh and Penny discover strange rashes on their skin. While Josh performs oral sex on her, Penny begins spitting up large amounts of blood and her flesh starts melting. Josh radios for help and a voice claiming to be Dr. Edwards provides him with instructions.

Realizing that they need help but are stranded, Mark and Dobs search the island and find a bunker. Inside, the two friends discover research related to the bacteria. They also find mutated men who attempt to kill them. Mark and Dobs are able to escape them, but Dobs becomes infected.

The bunker turns out to be connected to Dr. Edwards’ laboratory. Josh reunites with Mark and Dobs and they find the researchers. After formulating a plan for extraction, Bridgett and Josh split off to gather Penny and wait for the boat on the beach. Dobs and Edwards also go on their own while Porter, Camila, and Marcus initiate the laboratory's self-destruct sequence.

Bridgett kills Josh and makes for the beach. Penny sees Bridgett trying to steal the dinghy and the two infected women fight to the death, dismembering each other in the process. Penny successfully kills Bridgett, but succumbs to her illness and dies on the shore. Edwards also manages to kill Dobs and escape to the beach with a rifle.

After rigging the lab to explode, Porter, Camila, and Marcus discover Dobs’ body and confront Dr. Edwards. Edwards prepares to shoot Marcus, but Porter produces a handgun of his own and kills Edwards after Camila tells Porter his wife has been dead the entire time and Edwards has been lying to him. Porter, Camila, and Marcus escape when the boat arrives.

On the boat, Porter gives Camila and Marcus each a bottled water to drink. Shortly thereafter, Camila and Marcus hear loud noises. They discover that Porter infected their water by injecting his blood into the bottles with a syringe before killing the boat captain and escaping in the dinghy. Camila and Marcus begin showing signs of infection. Flashbacks reveal that Porter stole a radio from the HAZMAT suit when he assaulted the researcher and used it to impersonate Edwards, leading Josh and the others to the laboratory. It is also shown that Porter infected a mouse which is what led to the initial outbreak. The movie ends with Porter heading to the mainland and the implication that Porter plans on spreading the infection to the world.

Cast

 Mitch Ryan as Marcus
 Ryan Donowho as Dobs
 Brando Eaton as Josh
 Jillian Murray as Penny
 Currie Graham as Dr. Edwards
 Lydia Hearst as Bridgett
 Sean Astin as Porter
 Solly Duran as Camila
 Claudette Lali as Kate
 Juan "Papo" Bancalari as Mr. Arias
 Marie Michelle Bazile as Elderly woman / Witch
 Roberto Linval as Jorge

Soundtrack
Cabin Fever: Patient Zero Original Motion Picture Soundtrack was released on July 22, 2014, under the record label Sumthing Else Music Works. The music was composed by Kevin Riepl, who has previously worked with Kaare Andrews on The ABCs of Death.

Reception
Cabin Fever: Patient Zero received mostly negative reviews from critics. Review aggregator website Rotten Tomatoes reported an approval rating of 24% based on 21 reviews, with an average rating of 4.20/10. On Metacritic, the film has a 28 out of 100 rating based on 11 critics, indicating "generally unfavorable reviews".

Brian Tallerico of RogerEbert.com gave the film a score of 1.5/4 stars, describing the first act as being "so defiantly stupid that I imagine most who rent it or struggle through it in a theater won't care that there's actually some material in the final act that clicks, mostly due to some incredibly strong makeup work." Scott Foundas of Variety described the film as "thoroughly lousy" and wrote: "Characters reliably behave with the utmost stupidity, entering a quarantine zone with no hazmat suit and venturing alone into the woods, as they navigate the obligatory genre gauntlet of zombified corpses and poor cell-phone reception." Robert Abele of the Los Angeles Times called the film a "slack, dumb prequel", and wrote: "Director Kaare Andrews’ and screenwriter Jake Wade Wall's interminable set-up is hardly worth the uninspired rollout of the second half's carnage follies, which save the most debilitating anatomical shredding and pulverizing for two female characters, who square off ... for the benefit of misogynistic gore pervs everywhere." Ben Kenisberg of The New York Times wrote: "Less methodical and witty than its predecessors, Patient Zero often turns its infected characters into mindless, lurching zombies."

Rob Staeger of The Village Voice was more positive in his review, writing that the film "delivers its share of anticipated gross-outs, which director Kaare Andrews presents with a sly, often lipless, grin", and praised the makeup effects.

Cancelled sequel and remake
A fourth entry in the series, titled Cabin Fever: Outbreak, was planned to be filmed back-to-back with Patient Zero, but was scrapped. The remake of Cabin Fever was released in February 2016. Eli Roth, the writer and director of the original film, produced the remake.

References

External links
 
 
 
 Cabin Fever: Patient Zero review Geexplosion.com
 Cabin Fever: Patient Zero (2014) de Kaare Andrews, algo más que una simple secuela exploit El Otro Cine (Spanish)

2014 films
English-language German films
German science fiction horror films
2010s English-language films
2014 horror films
Direct-to-video prequel films
American science fiction horror films
Films shot in the Dominican Republic
Films set on islands
Voltage Pictures films
2010s American films
American prequel films
German prequel films
2010s German films